Merridun is a historic home located at Union, Union County, South Carolina.  It was built about 1855, and is a two-story, Georgian style frame dwelling.  It features a massive two-storied Neoclassical portico with Corinthian order columns. It shelters a one-story verandah that extends partially around both sides of the house.

It was added to the National Register of Historic Places in 1974.

References

Houses on the National Register of Historic Places in South Carolina
Georgian architecture in South Carolina
Neoclassical architecture in South Carolina
Houses completed in 1855
Houses in Union County, South Carolina
National Register of Historic Places in Union County, South Carolina